Perley Ason Ross (6 April 1883 – 13 March 1939) was a U.S. experimental physicist who worked, carefully and without seeking publicity, at some essential problems in the behaviour of X-rays.

Born in Panacea, Missouri he was awarded his PhD from Stanford University in 1911, becoming a full professor there in 1927, after a year at Cornell University.

Some of his principal studies included:
Scattering of X-rays by matter;
Development of the Ross differential filter for X-ray spectroscopy;
X-ray polarization;
Compton scattering; and
Radiative Auger effect.

His daughter, Betsy, married fellow Stanford physicist William Webster Hansen.

References

1883 births
1938 deaths
Stanford University alumni
Stanford University Department of Physics faculty
Fellows of the American Physical Society